State Route 171 (SR 171) is an American  state highway that serves as a north-south connection between Northport and Hamilton through Fayette, Marion and Tuscaloosa Counties. SR 171 intersects US 43 at its southern terminus and US 43/US 278/SR 17 at its northern terminus.

Route description
SR 171 begins at its intersection with US 43 in Northport. From this point, SR 171 travels in a northerly direction through rural portions of northern Tuscaloosa County en route to Fayette. In Fayette, SR 171 intersects SR 159 and US 43 near its central business district and both SR 129 and SR 102 on its north side. The route continues in its northerly track and intersects US 78 and I-22 en route to its northern terminus at SR 17 in Hamilton. Additionally, between Fayette and its northern terminus SR 171 has a  concurrency with US 43. This route serves as an effective bypass of Berry and Stough for travelers on US 43, maintaining a north-to-south route while US 43 heads east-to-west to SR 18 East and SR 13 North near Berry, where US 43 returns to its main configuration towards Tuscaloosa.

Major intersections

References

171
Transportation in Fayette County, Alabama
Transportation in Marion County, Alabama
Transportation in Tuscaloosa County, Alabama
U.S. Route 43